Christina Louise "Tina" Cullen MBE (born 1 March 1970 in Stockport, Cheshire) is a field hockey player from England.

Cullen has represented Great Britain in two consecutive Summer Olympics, starting in 1996 when the team finished in fourth place.

She is a coach with Bowdon Hightown and has over 400 English Premier League goals to her name. She teaches sport at Greenbank High School and was awarded an MBE in the New Years honours list 2013.

References

External links
 

1970 births
Living people
British female field hockey players
English female field hockey players
Olympic field hockey players of Great Britain
Field hockey players at the 1996 Summer Olympics
Field hockey players at the 1998 Commonwealth Games
Field hockey players at the 2000 Summer Olympics
Commonwealth Games silver medallists for England
Sportspeople from Stockport
People educated at Bramhall High School
Commonwealth Games medallists in field hockey
Members of the Order of the British Empire
Medallists at the 1998 Commonwealth Games